The National Alliance's Party for Unity (Parti de l’Alliance Nationale pour l’Unité) is a centrist political party in the Democratic Republic of the Congo, founded in 2003. The leader of the party is former finance minister Dr. André-Philippe Futa who had a long career in the African Development Bank. During his term as Finance Minister, Futa had been elected Chairman of the Board of Governors of the International Monetary Fund and World Bank.

It supported incumbent President Joseph Kabila in the 2006 presidential elections and won four National Assembly seats in the general elections held the same day, along with a seat in the Senate.

Co-founding members
Sylvain Joël Bifuila
Justin Kalumba Mwana Ngongo
Joseph Futa Mbombo
Christine Kayiba
Jean-Marie Makamba Wanketa
Marcel Kiadi
Bosch Makasa Boshimpa
Jean-Pierre Mukwanga Mabala
Jean-Marie Phanzu
Thomas Bolifa Bumamampia
Célestine Bakemba Nsa
Jean-Pierre Minaida Kpasia III
Dr. Kasay Mingashanga
Dr. Serge Mpiana Tshipambe
Christian Tambi Bayene
Philémon Balinabo
Faustin Mulambu Mvuluya
Pascaline Ndoole Bindu
Musafiri Ngahangondi
Sylvain Mbalibukira
Florien Tambwe Lukanda
Joseph Kalala Ntumba
Kimanda Kibangula
Pacifique Byeka Sanda
Nyembo Zacharie Lumwanga

External links
 Parti de l'Alliance Nationale pour l'Unité

Political parties in the Democratic Republic of the Congo